Kolbudy  (formerly ) is a village in Gdańsk County, Pomeranian Voivodeship, in northern Poland. It is the seat of the gmina (administrative district) called Gmina Kolbudy.

For details of the history of the region, see History of Pomerania.

The village of Kolbudy has a population of 3,628, the gmina (administrative district) of Kolbudy has a population of 16,826.

References

Kolbudy